Sun Jiangshan (Simplified Chinese: 孙江山; born 24 October 1985, in Qingdao) is a Chinese football player who currently plays for Qingdao Youth Island in the China League Two.

Club career
Sun Jiangshan played for the Qingdao Jonoon youth before he was promoted to the senior team in the 2006 league season. With the season coming to an end and the club safely away from relegation the team's manager Yin Tiesheng would give Sun his chance to make his senior league debut for the club against Tianjin TEDA on October 15, 2006 where he came on as a late substitute in a 1-1 draw. The following season would see Sun make his first starting appearance for the club on May 5, 2007 in a league match against Beijing Guoan, which ended in a 3-1 defeat. By the end of the season Sun would make several further appearances for the club as he established himself as squad regular for the team, however it was the introduction of Guo Kanfeng as the team's new manager that saw Sun become the team's first choice right back when he played in twenty-three league games at the end of the 2009 league season. The following season saw Sun lose his place within the team as the club struggled to fight off relegation and it was only once the club brought in Chang Woe-Ryong did Sun see himself restored to the team's defence at the beginning of the 2011 league season.

In February 2017, Sun transferred to League One side Baoding Yingli ETS.

Career statistics
Statistics accurate as of match played 31 December 2020.

References

External links
 Player stats at Sohu.com

1985 births
Living people
Chinese footballers
Footballers from Qingdao
Qingdao Hainiu F.C. (1990) players
Baoding Yingli Yitong players
Chinese Super League players
China League One players
Association football defenders